W.A.K.O. World Championships 1993 may refer to:

 W.A.K.O. World Championships 1993 (Atlantic City)
 W.A.K.O. World Championships 1993 (Budapest)